Grant Allen Woodhams  (born 7 August 1952 in Sydney, New South Wales) is an Australian former politician. He was The Nationals member of the Western Australian Legislative Assembly from February 2005 to March 2013.

Arriving in Western Australia in 1967, Woodhams was schooled in Perth and Albany he graduated with a Bachelor of Arts from Murdoch University before starting work with ABC radio. After working with the ABC in Tasmania, New South Wales, Victoria and South Australia, Woodhams returned to Western Australia in 1990 to work in the Mid West. He left the ABC in 2004 to pursue his master's degree in Education.

At the 2005 state election, Woodhams defeated one-term Liberal MP Jamie Edwards to take the seat of Greenough for the Nationals. He was re-elected at the 2008 state election, again defeating an incumbent Liberal MP, Gary Snook, this time for the seat of Moore, following Greenough's abolition. Woodhams was elected Speaker of the Western Australian Legislative Assembly in November 2008. During his first term in the Legislative Assembly, Woodhams's style of oratory became renowned within the chamber for his adaptations of poems and songs, particularly in his budget reply speeches. While Speaker, further poetry was not forthcoming, but he concluded his valedictory speech in 2012 with his own version of "Clancy of the Overflow", entitled "Woodie, the Speaker of the Overflow".

Woodhams announced in 2012 that he would retire at the 2013 state election in order to spend more time with his family. He was succeeded by Shane Love who went on to hold the seat for the Nationals in 2013.

References

1952 births
Living people
Members of the Western Australian Legislative Assembly
Politicians from Sydney
Speakers of the Western Australian Legislative Assembly
National Party of Australia members of the Parliament of Western Australia
21st-century Australian politicians
Members of the Order of Australia